The Department of Public Expenditure, National Development Plan Delivery and Reform is a department of the Government of Ireland. It is led by the Minister for Public Expenditure, National Development Plan Delivery and Reform.

The department was established in July 2011, and took over the functions of Public Expenditure from the Department of Finance. The department is also responsible for overseeing the reform of the Public Sector.

Departmental team
The headquarters and ministerial offices of the department are in Government Buildings, Merrion Street, Dublin. The departmental team consists of the following:
Minister for Public Expenditure, National Development Plan Delivery and Reform: Paschal Donohoe, TD
Minister of State for Office of Public Works: Patrick O'Donovan, TD
Minister of State for Public Procurement and eGovernment: Ossian Smyth, TD
Secretary General of the Department: David Moloney

Overview

The department took over two of the six divisions within the Department of Finance. They are:
Public Expenditure Division – to establish and review short-term and medium-term current and capital public expenditure targets
Organisation, Management and Training Division – has overall responsibility for the management and development of the civil service

The department has 11 divisions:
 Civil Service Human Resources Division
 Corporate Office
 Expenditure Policy and Reporting Division
 Expenditure Management EU Policy and Audit Division
 Human Resources Strategy Unit
 Labour Market and Enterprise Policy Division
 Public Service Pay and Pensions Division
 Office of Government Procurement
 Office of the Chief Medical Officer
 Office of the Government Chief Information Officer
 Reform Division

History
The department was created by the Ministers and Secretaries (Amendment) Act 2011 with Brendan Howlin as its first minister.

Government reform legislation
Since its establishment, the department has introduced a number of government reform measures:
 Ombudsman (Amendment) Act 2012, which brought approximately 200 additional public bodies under the scrutiny of the Ombudsman;
 Houses of the Oireachtas (Inquiries, Privileges and Procedures) Act 2013, to provide for Oireachtas inquiries;
 Protected Disclosures Act 2014, protecting whistleblowers;
 Freedom of Information Act 2014, expanding the remit of FOI;
 Registration of Lobbyists Act 2015 providing for a new registration system; and
 Public Sector Standards Bill 2015 to update legislation on ethics in government.

See also
Revenue Commissioners

References

External links
Department of Public Expenditure, National Development Plan Delivery and Reform

 
Public Expenditure
Ireland, Public Expenditure
Economy of the Republic of Ireland
Ireland, Public Expenditure
2011 establishments in Ireland
Reform in Ireland